Tornel may refer to:

José María Tornel (1795–1853), Mexican army general and politician
Tornel, a tire manufacturer in Mexico